ControlTV was a live interactive reality web show executive produced by Seth Green and directed by Big Fantastic (the filmmaking collective behind series such as Prom Queen). Starting October 6, 2010, 25-year-old Tristan Couvares began the experiment of having his life filmed all day, every day, for a duration of 6 weeks.

Awards
ControlTV was awarded Digital Luminary Award from the National Association of Television Program Executives (NAPTE)  and receiving an Honorable Mention during the 2011 Webby Awards.

About
ControlTV produced by actor Seth Green, Matthew Senrich, Ken Fuchs, Steve Kessler, Richard Saperstein, Craig Ullman, and Shara Kay documented the life of Tristan Couvares for six weeks, starting October 6, 2010. The show was streamed live 24/7, and short, re-cap episodes were posted every weekday. The fans of Control TV had been dubbed "the controllers" and voted on various aspects of daily life such as what Tristan would eat, when he would wake up and what he would wear. At one point, the majority of the viewers voted for Tristan Couvares to have an hour off camera. During the show, many cuss words were bleeped out with a splash screen displaying the word "whoops" and a small repeating audio clip.

Viewership
In its first 14 days of release, ControlTV received more than 3 million completed unique episode views, with viewers staying for an average of 27 minutes per visit on the live feed. By the end of season one the show had accumulated over 13 million completed unique episode views.

Sponsorship
Ford, Snickers, and Sprint were sponsors of the show. Tristan Couvares drove a Ford and used a Sprint cell phone. Every few days, Tristan Couvares would eat a Snickers bar on camera. At the end of the series, the viewers voted to let Tristan Couvares keep the Ford Fiesta that was provided by Ford.

Season 1 episode list

References

External links

American non-fiction web series
2010 American television series debuts
2010 American television series endings
2010s American reality television series